The 2008 Vaahteraliiga season was the 29th season of the highest level of American football in Finland. The regular season took place between May 24 and August 30, 2008. The Finnish champion was determined in the playoffs and at the championship game Vaahteramalja XXIX the Porvoo Butchers won the Helsinki Roosters.

Standings

Playoffs

References 

American football in Finland
Vaahteraliiga
Vaahteraliiga